Richmond is a suburb of Sheffield in South Yorkshire, England.  It lies in the eastern part of the city.

Richmond was historically a small settlement consisting of a few cottages and Richmond Hall Farm, built in 1668 and demolished in 1966. Gateposts from the farm, which may have originally flanked an entrance to Sheffield Park, can still be seen amidst a housing estate dating from the late 1960s.

The suburb is served by St Catherine of Siena church, designed by Basil Spence.

Electoral ward 
Richmond gives its name to one of the 28 electoral wards of Sheffield, in the southern part of the city.  In addition to the suburb of Richmond, Richmond ward also includes the districts of  Four Lane Ends, Intake, and Woodthorpe, and covers an area of 4.5 km2. The population of the ward in 2011 was 17,724 people in 7,827 households. It is one of the five wards that form the Sheffield Heeley parliamentary constituency. The boundary changed at the local elections in May 2016.

Four Lane Ends
Four Lane Ends is the crossroads at the bottom of Birley Moor Road, where it continues as Mansfield Road with the B6063 cutting through from Normanton Hill, where it becomes Hollinsend Road heading towards Gleadless.

Intake 

Intake lies south of Manor Top. It is primarily a 1930s residential area. Jarvis Cocker, lead singer of the band Pulp was born in the area. The area also features a local cemetery.

Woodthorpe
Built in the 1930s, Woodthorpe lies to the east of Intake. It has two pubs, the "High Noon" and "The Springwood", and also has a primary school (Woodthorpe), which was rebuilt in September 2005. However now "The Springwood" has closed down due to unpopular demand in the area and it is now abandoned and boarded up.

References

Areas of Sheffield
Wards of Sheffield